HMS Ruby was one of 20  (later H-class) destroyers built for the Royal Navy that served in the First World War. The Acorn class were smaller than the preceding  but oil-fired and better armed. Launched in 1910, the ship served with the Second Destroyer Flotilla, joining the Grand Fleet at the start of the war. The destroyer served in escort and patrol roles, protecting merchant ships against German submarines. Despite multiple sightings and attacks, no submarine was claimed destroyed. In 1915, escort service in the Irish Sea proved too much for the destroyer's hull, which leaked and needed to be repaired. In 1917, the vessel was transferred to the Mediterranean Fleet, joining the Fifth Destroyer Flotilla. After the Armistice, the destroyer served in the Black Sea until being placed in reserve in 1919. Ruby was sold to be broken up in 1921.

Design and description

After the preceding coal-burning , the  saw a return to oil-firing. Unlike previous destroyer designs, where the individual yards had been given discretion within the parameters set by the Admiralty, the Acorn class were a set, with the propulsion machinery the only major variation between the different ships. This enabled costs to be reduced. The ships were later renamed H class.

Displacement was  normal and  full load. Power was provided by Parsons steam turbines fed by four White-Forster boilers and driving three shafts. Three funnels were fitted, the foremost tall and thin, the central short and thick and the aft narrow. On trial, Ruby achieved .

Armament consisted of two single BL  Mk VIII guns, one carried on the forecastle and another aft. Two single QF 12-pounder  guns were mounted between the first two funnels. Two rotating  torpedo tubes were mounted aft of the funnels, with two reloads carried, and a searchlight fitted between the tubes. The destroyer was later modified to carry a single Vickers QF 3-pounder  anti-aircraft gun, and depth charges for anti-submarine warfare. The ship's complement was 72 officers and ratings.

Construction and career
The 20 destroyers of the Acorn class were ordered by the Admiralty under the 1909–1910 Naval Programme. One of three in the class sourced from J. Samuel White, Ruby was laid down at the company's East Cowes shipyard on 15 February 1910 with yard number 1317 and launched on 4 November. The vessel was completed on 7 April 1911, the tenth ship in Royal Navy service to be given the name, the first recorded use being in 1596. On commissioning, Ruby joined the Second Destroyer Flotilla. 

After the British Empire declared war on Germany at the beginning of the First World War in August 1914, the Flotilla became part of the Grand Fleet based at Scapa Flow. On 23 August, while sailing with the Fleet on an exercise, the destroyer reported seeing a submarine, but no other contact was made. Between 13 and 15 October, the Flotilla supported the battleships of the Grand Fleet in a practice cruise. Soon afterwards, the destroyers were deployed to Devonport to undertake escort and patrol duties, protecting merchant ships against German submarines. As February 1915 unfolded, the destroyer was detached to Barrow-in-Furness. The operation was arduous and led to the ship's hull leaking and having to dock on 14 February, eventually returning to Scapa Flow four days later. Similarly, on 28 August, the flotilla took part in an anti-submarine patrol in the North Sea, accompanied by battleships and cruisers. Again, this was unsuccessful at destroying any submarines. 

The destroyer was subsequently attached to the Admiral of Minesweeping based at Devonport. The Devonport-based destroyers were responsible for escorting merchant ships travelling from North and South America, Gibraltar, Dakar and the Cape. Some of these carried very valuable cargo. For example, on 31 January 1917 the destroyer formed part of the escort for the ocean liner  that was carrying gold to Halifax, Nova Scotia. Meanwhile, the demand from the merchant marine for escorts was increasing. By April, between 120 and 140 vessels were needing escort as they arrived or departed. However, on 28 May 1917, the repaired Ruby was left with only sister ship  as an ally to protect the myriad of vessels passing through, and as a consequence seven ships were sunk in the next two days. On 24 July, while patrolling off the coast of Plymouth, the destroyer attacked a German submarine with depth charges. A similar attack took place off Lough Swilly on 7 August. In both cases, once again, no hits were reported.

Soon afterwards, as the need for destroyers in the Mediterranean Sea became more acute, the destroyer was transferred to the Fifth Destroyer Flotilla of the Mediterranean Fleet. On 20 January 1918, Ruby was based at the naval base in Malta undergoing refit. The introduction of convoys had improved the survivability of merchant ships, but submarine activity was still significant. At the same time, the Otranto Barrage required between 27 and 31 destroyers on station each day, so there was substantial work to be done and the destroyer was soon back in service. Although the Armistice of 11 November ended fighting on the Western Front, in the Black Sea, the Russian Revolution meant that the warship was still required to serve. On 25 November, the destroyer joined a large British naval flotilla that sailed to Sevastapol. The Russian vessel was commissioned on 24 December 1919 in Malta but was not handed to a Russian crew as planned due to a lack of personnel.

In the meantime, the Armistice meant that the Royal Navy needed to return to a peacetime level of strength and both the number of ships and the amount of staff reduced to save money. Ruby was placed in reserve at Nore. This position did not last long. The harsh conditions of wartime operations, particularly the combination of high speed and poor weather, exacerbated by the fact that the hull was not galvanised, meant that the destroyer was worn out. Ruby was sold to be broken up at Milford Haven to Thos. W. Ward on 9 May 1921.

Pennant numbers

References

Citations

Bibliography

 

 
 
 

 

1910 ships
Ruby (1910)
Ships built on the Isle of Wight
Ruby (1910)